Sapintus is a genus of antlike flower beetles in the family Anthicidae. There are at least 13 described species in Sapintus.

Species
 Sapintus arizonicus Werner, 1962
 Sapintus caudatus Werner, 1962
 Sapintus corticalis (LeConte, 1851)
 Sapintus fulvipes (LaFerté-Sénectère, 1849)
 Sapintus hispidulus Casey, 1895
 Sapintus lemniscatus Werner, 1962
 Sapintus lutescens (Champion, 1890)
 Sapintus pallidus (Say, 1826)
 Sapintus pubescens (LaFerté-Sénectère, 1849)
 Sapintus pusillus (LaFerté-Sénectère, 1849)
 Sapintus similis Werner, 1983
 Sapintus teapensis (Champion, 1890)
 Sapintus timidus Casey, 1895

References

 Chandler, Donald S. / Arnett, Ross H. Jr, Michael C. Thomas, Paul E. Skelley, and J. H. Frank, eds. (2002). "Family 117: Anthicidae Latreille 1819". American Beetles, vol. 2: Polyphaga: Scarabaeoidea through Curculionoidea, 549–558.
 Werner, F. G. (1962). "A Revision of the Nearctic Species of Sapintus (Coleoptera: Anthicidae)". Annals of the Entomological Society of America, vol. 55, no. 5, 492–498.

Further reading

 Arnett, R. H. Jr., M. C. Thomas, P. E. Skelley and J. H. Frank. (eds.). (21 June 2002). American Beetles, Volume II: Polyphaga: Scarabaeoidea through Curculionoidea. CRC Press LLC, Boca Raton, Florida .
 
 Richard E. White. (1983). Peterson Field Guides: Beetles. Houghton Mifflin Company.

External links

 NCBI Taxonomy Browser, Sapintus

Anthicidae